{{Speciesbox
| image = 
| taxon = Delphinella peckii
| authority = (Lindau) M.E.Barr (1986)
| synonyms = 
 Cucurbitaria conigena (Peck) Kuntze
 Delphinella tsugae 
 Diplosphaerella conigena 
 Mycosphaerella conigena 
 Mycosphaerella conigena 
 Mycosphaerella peckii 
 Mycosphaerella tsugae 
 Rehmiellopsis conigena 
 Scirrhia conigena 
 Sphaerella conicola 
 Sphaerella conigena 
 Sphaerella peckii 
 Sphaerella tsugae 
}}Delphinella peckii is a species of fungus in the family Dothioraceae. It was transferred to the genus Delphinella from the genus Mycosphaerella'' in 1986.

References

Fungi described in 1897
Fungi of Canada
Dothideales
Taxa named by Gustav Lindau